David Schofield (born 16 December 1951) is an English actor. He is best known for his role as Ian Mercer in the films Pirates of the Caribbean: Dead Man's Chest (2006) and Pirates of the Caribbean: At World's End (2007). He also appeared in the films An American Werewolf in London (1981), Gladiator (2000), From Hell (2001), Valkyrie (2008), The Wolfman (2010) and Darkest Hour (2017).

Early life
Schofield was born in Wythenshawe, Manchester, England on New Year's Day, one of ten children in a working-class family. He attended St. John Fisher and Thomas More R.C. Primary School, along with his brother, Peter. His first acting experience was at Manchester Boys' School at the age of 12. In 1967 he was accepted as student assistant stage manager at a local repertory theatre. He worked in every department as a prop-maker, sound-man, writer, stage sweeper, waiter and tea-maker, putting in 14-hour days, six days a week. After two seasons, at the age of 19, he became a student of the London Academy of Music and Dramatic Art, which he left early to pursue his path as a working actor.

Career

Film and television
Schofield earned credits in TV series such as Band of Gold, Footballers' Wives and Holby City among many other TV productions. On the big screen he is best known as the paranoid darts player in the Slaughtered Lamb in An American Werewolf in London (1981), and his other films include The Dogs of War (1980), Tree of Hands (1989), The Last of the Mohicans (1992), Anna Karenina (1997), Gladiator (2000), From Hell (2001), and as Ian Mercer in the Pirates of the Caribbean films. He has also appeared in Valkyrie (2008) as anti-Hitler conspirator Erwin von Witzleben, The Wolfman (2010), F (2010), Burke and Hare (2010), Lord of Tears (2013) and as Peter Carmichael in the suspense thriller Last Passenger (2013). On TV he appeared alongside Jimmy Jewel in the ITV comedy-drama Funny Man (1981), played the title role Shackleton (1983), in Jekyll & Hyde (1990) starring Michael Caine, and played DCS John Salway in the award-winning BBC series Our Friends in the North in 1996. In 2008, he starred as Kirill, in the web series of the same name. In 2009 Schofield guest starred as King Alined in the BBC fantasy drama series Merlin. In 2011 he played the sinister Police Sergeant Foley in Hugo Blick's The Shadow Line, a seven-part series for BBC Two. In autumn 2015, he was seen as Odin in the episode "The Girl Who Died" in the ninth series of the BBC1 series Doctor Who. In 2016 he appeared as Vivan Wolsey in the BBC series' Father Brown episode 4.1 "The Mask of the Demon" and The Coroner episode 2.6 "Life". In 2017 he appeared as Abbot Eadred in The Last Kingdom. In 2018, he appeared as Thomas the Apostle in the film Mary Magdalene, written by Helen Edmundson.

Stage
Schofield has performed for the Royal Shakespeare Company, the Royal National Theatre, and the Royal Exchange, Manchester. He created the role of John Merrick in Bernard Pomerance’s play The Elephant Man for its premiere in 1977. He played Roy Cohn in the National's 1993 production of Angels in America. He also acted in musicals (Saucy Jack and the Space Vixens) and plays on the West End stage in London.

Radio
In 2001-02 Schofield appeared as Javert in a BBC radio adaptation of Les Misérables. Since 2007 he has played Frank Twist in the BBC Radio 4 drama series Brief Lives set in a Manchester legal practice. In 2011, he played Tellwright in Helen Edmundson's adaptation of Anna of the Five Towns.

Selected filmography

Theatre
John Merrick, The Elephant Man at the Hampstead Theatre (1977) and at the Royal National Theatre, London (1981)
Mick Plenty at the Lyttelton Theatre (1978)
Mark Antony, Julius Caesar at the Royal Shakespeare Theatre, Stratford-upon-Avon (1983)
Angelo, Measure for Measure at the Royal Shakespeare Theatre, Stratford-upon-Avon and then at the Barbican (1983)
Duke of Buckingham, Henry VIII at the Royal Shakespeare Theatre, Stratford-upon-Avon (1983)
Pompey, Antony and Cleopatra at the National Theatre, London (1987)
Robb Lambert, Winding the Ball by Alex Finlayson at the Royal Exchange, Manchester (1989)
John Proctor, The Crucible by Arthur Miller at the Royal Exchange, Manchester (1990)
Macheath, The Beggar’s Opera by John Gay at the Royal Exchange, Manchester (1991)
Lyle Britten, Blues for Mister Charlie by James Baldwin at the Royal Exchange, Manchester (1992)
Roy M. Cohn, Angels in America by Tony Kushner at the National Theatre, London (1993)
Archie Rice, The Entertainer by John Osborne at the Royal Exchange, Manchester (2009)

Personal life
David Schofield's wife is Lally and their children are Fred and Blanche. Schofield is a patron of the Gesar Foundation.

References

External links

1951 births
Living people
English male film actors
English male stage actors
English male television actors
English male video game actors
20th-century English male actors
21st-century English male actors
Male actors from Manchester
Royal Shakespeare Company members
Alumni of the London Academy of Music and Dramatic Art
People from Wythenshawe